Toyan aka Ranking Toyan (born Byron Letts, died 1991) was a Jamaican reggae deejay active since the mid-1970s and best known for his early 1980s recordings.

Biography
Toyan began his career in 1974, deejaying on Kingston's sound systems, such as Socialist Roots and Romantic HiFi. He recorded his debut single, "Disco Pants" in the late 1970s for producer Don Mais. He went on to work extensively with Joseph Hoo Kim and Jah Thomas, resulting in a string of hits including "Girls Nowadays", "Kill No Man", "John Tom", and "Talk of the Town", as well as combination hits with The Mighty Diamonds ("Pretty Woman"), Badoo ("Rocking the 5000"), and Freddie McGregor ("Roots Man Skanking"). In 1981 he joined Henry "Junjo" Lawes' Volcano Sound system, and toured Canada. With Lawes, he recorded the album How the West Was Won, which is regarded as his best work, and went on to produce his own work and that of others such as Billy Boyo and Anthony Johnson. He toured the United Kingdom with the Jah Prophecy band and performed in Jamaica alongside Dennis Brown.

He was murdered in Jamaica in 1991.

Albums
How The West Was Won (1981) Greensleeves
Toyan (1982) J&L
Superstar Yellowman Has Arrived With Toyan (1982) Joe Gibbs (with Yellowman)
DJ Clash (1982) Volcano/Greensleeves (with Nicodemus)
Spar With Me (1982) Jah Guidance
Ghetto Man Skank (1983) Silver Camel
DJ Daddy (1983) Upfront
Nice Time (1983) Jam Rock/Pre (with Triston Palma)
Every Posse Want Me (1983) Live & Learn
Murder (1983) Vista Sounds (with Tipper Lee & Johnny Slaughter)
Hot Bubble Gum (1984) Power House
Early Days Roots Tradition

References

External links
Toyan at Roots Archives
Toyan at Reggaepedia

1991 deaths
Musicians from Kingston, Jamaica
Jamaican reggae musicians
Year of birth missing
Greensleeves Records artists